Bert Geer Phillips is an artist.

Bert Phillips may also refer to:

Bert Phillips, radio host on Town Hall Party
Bert Phillips, character played by Joan Van Ark

See also
Albert Phillips (disambiguation)
Robert Phillips (disambiguation)
Herbert Phillips (disambiguation)
Hubert Phillips, economist and author
Bertram Phillips, film director